Francisco Rodríguez (born 15 November 1957) is a Spanish judoka. He competed in the men's half-lightweight event at the 1984 Summer Olympics.

References

1957 births
Living people
Spanish male judoka
Olympic judoka of Spain
Judoka at the 1984 Summer Olympics
Place of birth missing (living people)
20th-century Spanish people